Fort Santiago, built in 1571, is a citadel built by Spanish navigator and governor Miguel López de Legazpi for the newly established city of Manila in the Philippines. The defense fortress is located in Intramuros, the walled city of Manila.

The fort is one of the most important historical sites in Manila. Several people died in its prisons during the Spanish Empire and World War II. José Rizal, one of the Philippine national heroes, was imprisoned here before his execution in 1896. The Rizal Shrine museum displays memorabilia of the hero in their collection and the fort features, embedded onto the ground in bronze, his footsteps representing his final walk from his cell to the location of the actual execution.

It is only a few meters away from the Manila Cathedral and the Palacio del Gobernador (lit. Governor's Palace, currently the office of the Commission on Elections).

Profile

The fort was named after Saint James (Santiago in Spanish), the patron saint of Spain, who is also known as Saint James the Muslim-slayer because of the legend that he miraculously appeared hundreds of years after his death to fight in the battle of Clavijo, whose relief adorns the façade of the front gate.  It is located at the mouth of the Pasig River and served as the premier defense fortress of the Spanish Government during their rule of the country. It became a main fort for the spice trade to the Americas and Europe for 333 years. The Manila Galleon trade to Acapulco, Mexico began from the Fuerte de Santiago.

The south front, which looks toward the city, is a curtain with a terreplein, flanked by two demi-bastions - the Bastion of San Fernando, on the riverside, and the Bastion of San Miguel, by the bayside. A moat connected with the river separates the fort from the city. Near the beginning of the north face, instead of a bastion, a cavalier called Santa Barbara was built with three faces of batteries, one looking seaward over the anchorage place, one facing the entrance, and the third looking upon the river. The latter is united with a tower of the same height as the walls, through which there is a descent to the water battery placed upon a semicircular platform, thus completing the triangular form of the fort.

The communication with the river and the sea was by an obscure postern gate - the Postigo de la Nuestra Señora del Soledad (Postern of Our Lady of Solitude). Inside the fort were guard stations, together with the barracks of the troops of the garrison and quarters of the warden and his subalterns. Also inside the fort were various storehouses, a chapel, the powder magazine, the sentry towers, the cisterns, etc.

History

The location of Fort Santiago was once the site of a palisaded fort, armed with bronze guns, of Rajah Matanda, a Muslim Tagalog rajah of pre-Hispanic Manila who himself was a vassal to the Sultan of Brunei. The fort was destroyed by maestre de campo (master-of-camp) Martin de Goiti who, upon arriving in 1570 from Cebu, fought several battles with the Muslim natives. The Spaniards started building Fort Santiago (Fuerte de Santiago) after the establishment of the city of Manila under Spanish rule on June 24, 1571, and made Manila the capital of the newly colonized islands.

The first fort was a structure of palm logs and earth. Most of it was destroyed when the city was invaded by Chinese pirates led by Limahong. Martin de Goiti was killed during the siege. After a fierce conflict, the Spaniards under the leadership of Juan de Salcedo, eventually drove the pirates out to Pangasinan province to the north, and eventually out of the country.
The construction of Fort Santiago with hard stone, together with the original fortified walls of Intramuros, commenced in 1590 and finished in 1593 during the reign of Gómez Pérez Dasmariñas.  The stones used were volcanic tuff quarried from Guadalupe (now Guadalupe Viejo in Makati).  The fort as Dasmariñas left it consisted of a castellated structure without towers, trapezoidal in trace, its straight gray front projecting into the river mouth. Arches supported an open gun platform above, named the battery of Santa Barbara, the patron saint of all good artillerymen. These arches formed casemates which afforded a lower tier of fire through embrasures. Curtain walls of simplest character, without counter forts or interior buttresses, extended the flanks to a fourth front facing the city. In 1714, the ornate gate of Fort Santiago was erected together with some military barracks.  The Luzon earthquakes of 1880, which destroyed much of the city of Manila, destroyed the front edifice of the fort changing its character.

During the leadership of Fernándo Valdés y Tamon in the 1730s, a large semicircular gun platform to the front called media naranja (half orange) and another of lesser dimensions to the river flank were added to the Bastion of Santa Barbara. The casemates were then filled in and embrasures closed. He also changed the curtain wall facing cityward to a bastioned front. A lower parapet, bordering the interior moat, connects the two bastions.

British occupation

On September 24, 1762, British forces led by Brigadier-General William Draper and Rear-Admiral Samuel Cornish invaded and captured Manila, and along with it Fort Santiago. It was during this time that the fort served as a base of operations for the Royal Navy until April 1764 when they agreed to a ceasefire with the Spanish.

American colonial period

On August 13, 1898, the American flag was raised in Fort Santiago signifying the start of the American rule in the Philippines. The fort served as the headquarters for the U.S. Army and several changes were made to the fort by the Americans. One of these changes included the draining of the moats surrounding the fort. The grounds were then transformed into a golf course.

World War II

During World War II, Fort Santiago was captured by the Japanese Imperial Army, and used its prisons and dungeons including the storage cells and gunpowder magazines for hundreds of prisoners who were killed near the end of the war (see Manila massacre).  The fort sustained heavy damage from American and Filipino military mortar shells during the Battle of Manila in February 1945.  Also, approximately 600 American prisoners of war died of suffocation or hunger after being held in extremely tight quarters in the dungeons at Fort Santiago.

The fort today
Today, the fort, its bastions, and the prison dungeons for criminals used by the Spanish officials, is now part of a historical park which also includes Plaza Moriones and several ruins.  The park houses well-preserved legacies from the Spanish Colonial Period including memorabilia of José Rizal at the Rizal Shrine, a replica of his ancestral house in Laguna province.

Adaptive use of this famous historical landmark makes certain areas ideal for open air theater, picnics, and as a promenade. The Intramuros Visitors center gives an overview of the various attractions in the walled city.

Preservation
After its destruction during WWII, Fort Santiago was declared as a Shrine of Freedom in 1950.  Its restoration by the Philippine government did not begin till 1953 under the hands of the National Parks Development Committee. The Intramuros Administration now manages the reconstruction, maintenance, and management of the fort since 1992.

Gallery

See also
Fort of San Antonio Abad

References

U.S. War Department (1903). "Annual Report of the War Department, 1903 Vol. III". Government Printing Office, Washington.

External links

The gate of Fort Santiago in the 1920s from Flickr

Buildings and structures in Intramuros
Santiago
National Shrines of the Philippines
Spanish Colonial Fortifications of the Philippines
Landmarks in the Philippines
History of the Philippines (1565–1898)
Spanish colonial infrastructure in the Philippines
Cultural Properties of the Philippines in Metro Manila
Tourist attractions in Manila
Reportedly haunted locations in the Philippines